Don't Give Up on Me is an album by Solomon Burke, or the title song.

"Don't Give Up on Me" may also refer to:
"Don't Give Up on Me" (Andy Grammer song), 2019
"Don't Give Up on Me" (Kill the Noise and Illenium song), 2018
Don't Give Up on Me Now, 2011 single by Ben Harper
"Don't Give Up on Me", 2020 single by Jamie Cullum
"Don't Give Up on Me", 2017 song from the Take That album, Wonderland
"Touchdown Turnaround (Don't Give Up on Me)", a song from the 2006 debut album titled Zombies! Aliens! Vampires! Dinosaurs!